Stjepan Jukić (born 10 December 1979) is a Croatian retired football player.

Club career
Jukić has previously played for NK Osijek, HNK Šibenik and Inter Zapresic in the Croatian First League.

In 2008, he played for Sanfrecce Hiroshima of the J2 League.

On 20 February 2010, Jukić was signed by Qingdao Jonoon as its first foreign footballer that season. He made his debut for the club in the first round match against Tianjin Teda, in which he served Slovenian Aleksander Rodić for the first goal. In the whole season, he capped 27 times with 4 goals and 4 services.

In 2011, Jukić has agree to sign a one-year contract with Chongqing Lifan. But he suffered a leg fracture during a pre-sonson friendly match in February, which ruling him out for the rest of the 2011 league season.

References

External links
 

1979 births
Living people
Sportspeople from Đakovo
Association football midfielders
Croatian footballers
NK Osijek players
HNK Šibenik players
K.S.C. Lokeren Oost-Vlaanderen players
Sanfrecce Hiroshima players
NK Croatia Sesvete players
Qingdao Hainiu F.C. (1990) players
Chongqing Liangjiang Athletic F.C. players
Croatian Football League players
Belgian Pro League players
J2 League players
Chinese Super League players
Croatian expatriate footballers
Expatriate footballers in Belgium
Croatian expatriate sportspeople in Belgium
Expatriate footballers in Japan
Croatian expatriate sportspeople in Japan
Expatriate footballers in China
Croatian expatriate sportspeople in China